Quarino was an African-born inhabitant of  New Providence, Bahamas who was part of a slave revolt.

In 1734, after running away from his plantation, Quarino allegedly traveled to different settlements to recruit participants in a revolt.  He was finally captured by soldiers, killing one with a knife.  

During his interrogation, Quarino revealed a plot to kill all the white inhabitants of the island and take control of it.  The first target was to be the acting Governor, Richard Fitzwilliam.

References

Slave rebellions in North America
History of the Colony of the Bahamas
Slavery in the British West Indies